The Scythian genealogical myth was an epic cycle of the Scythian religion detailing the origin of the Scythians. This myth held an important position in the worldview of Scythian society, and was popular among both the Scythians of the northern Pontic region and the Greeks who had colonised the northern shores of the Pontus Euxinus.

Narrative

Five variants of the Scythian genealogical myth have been retold by Greco-Roman authors, which all traced the origin of the Scythians to the god Dargatavah and to the Scythian Snake-Legged Goddess:
 Hērodotos of Halikarnāssos's recorded two variants of the myth, and according to his first version, the first man born in hitherto desert Scythia was named Targitaos and was the son of "Zeus" and a daughter of the river Borysthenēs. Targitaos in turn had three sons, who each ruled a different part of the kingdom, named:
 Lipoxais
 Arpoxais
 Kolaxais
One day four gold objects – a plough, a yoke, a battle-axe, a drinking cup – fell from the sky, and each brother in turn tried to pick the gold, but when Lipoxais and Arpoxais tried, it burst in flames, while the flames were extinguished when Kolaxais tried.
 According to the second version of the myth recorded by Hērodotos, Hēraklēs arrived in deserted Scythia with Gēruōn's cattle. After his mares disappeared during his sleep, he searched for them until he arrived at a land called , that is the Woodland, and in a cave found a half-maiden, half-viper being who later revealed to him that she was the mistress of this country, and that she had kept Hēraklēs's horses, which she agreed to return only if he had sexual intercourse with her. She returned his freedom to Hēraklēs after three sons were born of their union:
 Agathyrsos
 Gelōnos
 Skythēs 
Before Hēraklēs left Scythia, the serpent maiden asked him what should be done once the boys had reached adulthood, and he gave her his bow and his girdle and told her that they should be each tasked with stringing the bow and putting on the girdle in the correct way, with whoever succeeded being the one who would rule his mother's land while those who would fail the test would be banished. When the time for the test had arrived, only the youngest of the sons, Skythēs, was able to correctly complete it, and he thus became the ancestor of the Scythians and their first king, with all subsequent Scythian kings claiming descent from him. Agathyrsos and Gelōnos, who were exiled, became the ancestors of the Agathyrsoi and Gelōnoi.
 A third variant of the myth, recorded by Gaius Valerius Flaccus, described the Scythians as descendants of Colaxes, who was himself a son of the god Iūpiter with a half-serpent nymph named Hora.
 The fourth variant of the myth, recorded by Diodōros of Sicily, calls Skythēs the first Scythian and the first king, and describes him as a son of "Zeus" and an earth-born viper-limbed maiden.

Interpretation

""
The "Hēraklēs" of Hērodotos's second version and from the 's version of the genealogical myth is not the Greek hero Hēraklēs, but the Scythian god Dargatavah, who appears in the other recorded variants of the genealogical myth under the name of Targitaos or Skythēs as a son of "Zeus" (that is, the Scythian Sky Father Papaios), and was likely assimilated by the Greeks from the northern shores of the Black Sea with the Greek Hēraklēs. The mother's traits are consistent across the multiple versions of the genealogical myth and include her being the daughter of either a river-god or of the Earth and dwelling in a cave, as well as her being half-woman and half-snake.

The reference to "Hēraklēs" driving the cattle of Gēryōn also reflects the motif of the cattle-stealing god widely present among Indo-Iranian peoples, and the reference to him stealing Gēryōn's cattle after defeating him in Hērodotos's second version of the genealogical myth and of his victory against the river-god Araxēs in the 's version were Hellenised versions of an original Scythian myth depicting the typical mythological theme of the fight of the mythical ancestor-hero, that is of Dargatavah, against the chthonic forces, through which he slays the incarnations of the primordial chaos to create the Cosmic order. A Scythian depiction of the combat against this chthonic personification of chaos might have been present on one of the bone plaques decorating a comb from the Haymanova Mohyla, which was decorated with the scene of two Scythians fighting a monster with the front-legs of a lion, a scaly body, and a fish- or dragon-like split tail, with the monster's appearance connecting it to the element of water, and therefore to the chthonic realm; one of the Scythians in the scene is depicted as dying in the monster's leonine paws while the second man kills it with a spear.

The myth of ""
After concealing Hēraklēs, the goddess, under guise of introducing the Giants one by one, treacherously handed them to Hēraklēs, who killed them. According to this hypothesis, Aphroditē Apatouros was the same goddess as the Snake-Legged Goddess of the Scythian genealogical myth, and her reward to "Hēraklēs" for defeating the Giants was her love.

The sons of Dargatavah

Lipoxais, Arpoxais, and Kolaxais
The names of Dargatavah's sons in the first version of the genealogical myth – Lipoxais, Arpoxais, and Kolaxais – end with the suffix "," which is a Hellenisation of the Old Iranian term  meaning ruler:
Lipoxais, from Scythian , from an earlier form , means "king of radiance," in the sense of "king of the sun."
Arpoxais, from Scythian , means "king of the airspace."
The element  might have been a cognate of the Sanskrit term , which is the name of a group of Indo-Aryan deities of the airspace.
Kolaxais, from Scythian , means "blacksmith king," in the sense of "ruling king of the lower world."

Each of the sons of Dargatavah were forebearers of tribes constituting the Scythian people:
Lipoxšaya was the ancestor of the Aukhatai;
Arbuxšaya was the ancestor of the Katiaroi and the Traspies;
Kolaxšaya was the ancestor of the Paralatai, also known as the Royal Scythians.

Progenitors of the social classes

The name  was a Greek reflection of the Scythian name , which was a cognate of the Avestan title , which means "placed at the front" or "placed in the lead," and was a title held by Scythian kings.

In Gaius Valerius Flaccus's narrative, Auchus, that is Lipoxšaya, was born with white hair and wore a band which passed around his head three times and whose ends hanged backwards, with the colour white in Indo-Iranian tradition being that of priesthood, and the headband of Auchus being part of a priest's regalia which was depicted in the art of the various ancient Iranian peoples. These thus signalled Lipoxšaya as the progenitor of Aukhatai, that is the priestly component of Scythian society's tripartite class system.

Arbuxšaya, meanwhile, was the progenitor of the Katiaroi and Traspies, who formed the third section of the Scythian class system, that of the ordinary populace consisting of farmers and horse-breeders. This finds a parallen in the Zoroastrian tradition, where Haošiiaŋha's brother Vaēgerēδ was the ancestor of farmers.

The three sons of Dargatavah were thus ancestors of the various social classes of Scythian society who also represented the three levels of the Cosmos: the upper celestial realm, the middle sphere of the airspace, and the lower terrestrial world, with the central son representing the airspace linking the two others, which also parallels the roles of the Sky Father Papaios, the Earth-and-Water Mother Api, and their child, Dargatavah, that is the airspace.

The  and kingship
The four golden objects which fell from the sky also represented the various Scythian classes, with the plough used by farmers to till the fields and the yoke associated with cattle-breeding, representing the lowest class of the Katiaroi and Traspies; the battle-axe reoresenting the warrior class; and the cup, used during religious rituals for offering libations, representing the priestly class.

The myth of the golden objects which fell from the sky was also present among the Saka of Central Asia, and therefore must have been an ancient Iranian tradition.

The parallels between the Zoroastrian and Scythian myths imply that the narrative of the ancestor of the Paralatā, Kolaxšaya, succeeding in acquiring the gold objects which had fallen from the sky was also an explanation of the supremacy of the tribe descended from him, that is the Royal Scythians, over the other Scythian tribes, and of the Scythian kings, who bore the title of Paralatā.

Zoroastrian parallels
Zoroastrian mythology, Haošiiaŋha was the ancestor of the warrior class, that is of the military aristocracy of which the kings were members. According to the version of the genealogical myth recorded by Gaius Valerius Flaccus, Kolaxšaya and his warriors decorated their shields with "fired divided into three parts," flashing lightning, and pictures of red wings, with the colour red being characteristic of the warrior class in Indo-Iranian tradition.

Parallels with the 

The parallels between this Persian myth and the second version of the Scythian genealogical myth recorded by Hērodotos thus attest that the latter myth was of a typically Iranic origin.

The first version of the genealogical myth recounted by Hērodotos also explains the division of Scythia into three kingdoms of which the king of the Royal Scythians was the High King, which is a structure also recorded in Hērodotos's account of the Scythian campaign of the Persian king Dārayavaʰuš I, where Idanthyrsos was the Scythian high king while Skōpasis and Taxakis were sub-kings.

Agathyrsos, Gelōnos, Skythēs
The sons of Dargatavah according to the second version of the genealogical myth were each also ancestors of tribes belonging to the Scythian cultures:
Agathyrsos was the ancestor of the Agathyrsoi
Gelōnos was the ancestor of the Gelōnoi
Skythēs was the ancestor of the Scythians proper

References

Sources

Further reading 

 
 Podossinov, Alexander V. "HERACLES CELTICUS AND HERACLES SCYTHICUS: THE SAME NARRATIVE IN THE WEST AND THE EAST OF EUROPE?” Connecting the Ancient West and East: Studies Presented to Prof. Gocha R. Tsetskhladze. Edited by J. Boardman et al., vol. 8, Peeters Publishers, 2022, pp. 1291–306. JSTOR, https://doi.org/10.2307/j.ctv2zx9pwv.84. Accessed November 11, 2022.
 Redondo, Jordi. "The Herodotean Myth on the Origin of the Scythians". Myth and History: Close Encounters, edited by Menelaos Christopoulos, Athina Papachrysostomou and Andreas P. Antonopoulos, Berlin, Boston: De Gruyter, 2022, pp. 167–186. .

Scythian religion
Iranian mythology
Asian mythology
European mythology